Agrupación Deportiva Torrejón Club de Fútbol is a team of football in Spain, in the town of Torrejon de Ardoz in Community of Madrid. It was founded in 2001 after the merger between the AD Torrejón and the Torrejón CF.

The club has 2 sections: a men's soccer team that plays in Tercera División RFEF – Group 7 and their female division boasts the club's only team playing football in a national division. The top team for women plays in the Segunda División Femenina, formerly part of the Superliga Femenina.

History 
The team base is at 2 other clubs in Torrejon, the AD Torrejón and the Torrejón CF, who decided to merge in the year 2001 to form a single professional team in the League, the AD Torrejón CF. The clubs trace their emergence back to 1953 when CD Torrejon first was established. 

The men's team managed to debut for the first time in Tercera División in the 2003-04 season, achieving a good sixth place, and remained in that category 2 seasons until the team fell. In the 2006-07 Torrejon was the leader of their group in Preferente, so he returned to Tercera Division. Currently struggle for permanence.

Season to season

7 seasons in Tercera División
1 season in Tercera División RFEF

Uniform 

Kit First: red T-shirt with diagonal white stripe, blue trousers and half.
Second kit T-shirt with blue stripe Diagonal white trousers and half white.

Stadium 
The AD Torrejón FC plays its matches in The Veredillas Stadium. The field, located in Torrejón de Ardoz, it has capacity for 1,500 people.

Women's Soccer 

AD Torrejón's section of female football campaigned in the Superliga Femenina, the highest level in Spain, between 2002 and 2011. The section was opened in 1996, and in its first year was regional champion, quickly ascending to the Superliga. His greatest achievement came in the 1998-99 season, when the Torrejón CF was runner-up Spain. The first team is coached by Laura Perez Torviscas.

In its staff came to play in the year 2002 Milene Domingues, ex-wife Ronaldo and considered one of the best female soccer players.

References

External links 
 
AD Torrejón CF on Futmadrid.com

Football clubs in the Community of Madrid
Divisiones Regionales de Fútbol clubs
Association football clubs established in 2002
2002 establishments in Spain
Sport in Torrejón de Ardoz